Dhaliwal Dona  is a village in Kapurthala district of Punjab State, India. The village is administrated by a Sarpanch. who is an elected representative of village.

Demography
According to the 2011 Census of India, Dhaliwal Dona has a total number of 313 houses and population of 1,504 of which include 782 males and 722 females.  Literacy rate of Dhaliwal Dona is 73.56%, lower than state average of 75.84%.  The population of children under the age of 6 years is 169 which is  11.24% of total population of Dhaliwal Dona, and child sex ratio is approximately  837, lower than state average of 846.

66 per cent of the population were designated as Schedule Castes.

Air travel 
The closest airport to the village is Sri Guru Ram Dass Jee International Airport.

Villages in Kapurthala

External links
  Villages in Kapurthala
 Kapurthala Villages List

References

Villages in Kapurthala district